The Minahasa Peninsula, also spelled Minahassa, is one of the four principal peninsulas on the Indonesian island of Sulawesi. It stretches north from the central part of the island, before turning to the east and forming the northern boundary of the Gulf of Tomini and the southern boundary of the Celebes Sea.

The peninsula is divided into North Sulawesi and Gorontalo provinces, as well as part of Central Sulawesi. Its largest cities are Manado and Gorontalo, while Palu is located at its base.

The Minahasan languages, a branch of the Philippine languages, are spoken on the peninsula.

People
The Minahasan politician Antoinette Waroh was born here in 1901.

References

Peninsulas of Sulawesi
Landforms of Gorontalo (province)
Landforms of North Sulawesi
Landforms of Central Sulawesi